The Madness of George III is a 1991 play by Alan Bennett. It is a fictionalised biographical study of the latter half of the reign of George III of the United Kingdom, his battle with mental illness, and the inability of his court to handle his condition. It was adapted for film in 1994 as The Madness of King George.

Performance history
The play had its premiere on 28 November 1991 at the Lyttelton Theatre of the National Theatre in London. It was directed by Nicholas Hytner and designed by  Mark Thompson. The play starred Nigel Hawthorne as George III, Janet Dale as Queen Charlotte and Michael Fitzgerald as the Prince of Wales, also starring Julian Wadham, Charles Kay, Adrian Scarborough, Mark Lockyer and David Henry.

After its London run, the production toured the UK and the United States, returned to the National Theatre in 1993 and was then presented in Athens and Israel in 1994. Hawthorne repeated the role in the 1994 film, earning a Best Actor nomination in the Academy Awards.

The play was staged at the Lowell Davies Festival Theatre in San Diego, California, from June 19 to September 24, 2010.

On 18 January 2012, the play was revived at the Apollo Theatre. David Haig played George III.

A further revival took place in November 2018, at Nottingham Playhouse, with Mark Gatiss as the lead. This production was streamed on the National Theatre's YouTube channel in June 2020 as part of the NT at Home season.

Reviews
The play has been viewed as a character study for the actor who plays George III and most reviewers attribute its success to compelling performances from the two actors, Hawthorne and Haig, who played the king. Frank Rich of The New York Times singled out Nigel Hawthorne's performance in the US tour, calling it "astonishing" and "unforgettable", but he labelled the play itself as not "one of Bennett's major works" and as being more "marketable to Broadway and the colonies". Writing about the 2012 revival, Lyn Gardner said that Luscombe's production reminds us that "Bennett is not writing a royal Downton Abbey, but a play exploring appearance and reality", and that the play brings out the fact that amidst all the royal pomp the king is merely a man like everybody else. In The Telegraph, Charles Spencer praised Haig's performance, comparing it favorably to Hawthorne's performance twenty years earlier, saying "it seemed an impossible act to follow, but David Haig proves every inch Hawthorne’s equal in a performance of extraordinary emotion, tenderness and humour".

Writing on the 2018 Nottingham Playhouse run, Kate Maltby, writing for The Guardian notes that "Scarborough and Gatiss are electric", praising Powell for her "endearing" portrayal of Queen Charlotte. She notes that "Gatiss delivers a tour de force" in this "viscerally repulsive depiction of the gap between public and private life." even despite his descent into a "slobbering wreck" as George III. Maltby notes overall that this production is a "technically excellent production of a modern classic."  gaining it a 4 out of 5 rating.

Cast

Original Cast (National Theatre, 1991) 
 Nigel Hawthorne as George III
 Janet Dale as Queen Charlotte
 Michael Fitzgerald as the Prince of Wales
 Julian Wadham as William Pitt
 Anthony Calf as Captain Fitzroy
 Daniel Flynn as Captain Greville
 Charles Kay as Dr. Willis
 David Henry as Charles Fox
 Brian Shelley as Fortnum

Second London Run (Apollo Theatre, 2012) 

 David Haig as George III
 Beatie Edney as Queen Charlotte
 Christopher Keegan as the Prince of Wales
 William Belchambers as the Duke of York
 Charlotte Asprey as Lady Pembroke
 Ed Cooper Clarke as Captain Fitzroy
 Orlando James as Captain Greville
 Beruce Khan as Papandiek
 Ryan Saunders as Fortnum
 Peter McGovern as Braun
 Simon Markey as Prince's Footman
 Gary Mackay as Prince's Valet
Nicholas Rowe as William Pitt
 Thomas Wheatley as Lord Thurlow
 Richard Hansell as Dundas
 Gary Oliver as Charles Fox
 Patrick Moy as Sheridan
 Peter Pacey as Sir George Baker
Madhav Sharma as Dr Richard Warren
 John Webb as Sir Lucas Pepys
Clive Francis as Dr. Willis
 Karen Winchester as Margaret Nicholson
 Chris McCalphy as Willis' Henchman
 Haseeb Malik as Warren's assistant

Nottingham Playhouse Run (2018) 

 Mark Gatiss as George III
 Adrian Scarborough as Dr Willis
 Debra Gillett as Queen Charlotte
 Nadia Albina as Fitzroy
 Nicholas Bishop as William Pitt
 Amanda Hadingue as Fox/Dr Pepys
 Jack Holden as Greville
 David Hounslow as Thurlow
 Stephanie Jacob as Dr Baker/Sheridan
 Louise Jameson as Dr Warren
 Andrew Joshi as Dundas
 Adam Karim as Fortnum
 Harry Kershaw as Duke of York
 Billy Postlethwaite as Braun
 Sara Powell as Lady Pembroke
 Wilf Scolding as Prince of Wales
 Jessica Temple as Papandiek

References

Plays by Alan Bennett
Cultural depictions of George III
Plays about British royalty
Plays based on real people
Plays set in the 18th century
British plays adapted into films